The 1999 Hawaii Rainbow Warriors football team represented the University of Hawaii at Manoa in the 1999 NCAA Division I-A football season. Hawaii finished the 1999 season with a 9–4 record, going 5–2 in Western Athletic Conference (WAC) play. The Warriors capped the best single season turnaround in NCAA history with a win in the Oahu Bowl after going 0–12 the year before. New head coach June Jones led the Warriors to their first conference championship and bowl victory since the 1992 season.

Schedule

References

Hawaii
Hawaii Rainbow Warriors football seasons
Western Athletic Conference football champion seasons
Oahu Bowl champion seasons
Hawaii Rainbow Warriors football